Mexican Werewolf in Texas is a 2005 horror film directed by Scott Maginnis. The title is a reference to the 1981 horror comedy film An American Werewolf in London, which was written and directed by John Landis and is in turn a possible reference to the 1928 symphonic poem An American in Paris.

Plot
The residents of a small Texas town fight back against the mythical chupacabra, after multiple farm animals and several human residents are killed.

External links
 Mexican Werewolf in Texas at IMDB

2005 films
2005 horror films
American horror films
2000s English-language films
2000s American films